Hot Club de Paris were an English band from Liverpool. They were signed to Moshi Moshi Records and released their debut album Drop It 'Til It Pops in October 2006, and their second album Live at Dead Lake was released in June 2008. In 2010, the band released two EPs entitled With Days Like This As Cheap As Chewing Gum, Why Would Anyone Want To Work? and The Rise And Inevitable Fall Of The High School Suicide Cluster Band. Hot Club released their final album, Free The Pterodactyl Three, in 2011, and has been inactive since 2012. 

Following the disbanding of Hot Club de Paris, Paul Rafferty fronted Bad Meds and Doomshakalaka.

Discography

Albums/EPs

Singles
 "Sometimesitsbetternottostickbitsofeachotherineachotherforeachother" (2006)
 "Everyeveryeverything" (2006) UK No. 140
 "Shipwreck" (2007) UK No. 153
 "Clockwork Toy / You Can Call Me Al" (2007) UK #N/A
 "Will You Still Be In Love With Me Next Year?" (2007)
 "Hey! Housebrick" (2008)
 "My Little Haunting" (2008)

Sources

Interview
BBC gig review
Article on gigwise
"… drop it till it pops!?" on Retro. Life. Style.

English indie rock groups
Musical groups from Liverpool
Moshi Moshi Records artists